Thomas Miller was a Scottish amateur football left back who played in the Scottish League for Queen's Park and Vale of Leven.

Personal life 
Allan served as a sapper in the Royal Engineers during the First World War.

Career statistics

References 

Scottish footballers
Queen's Park F.C. players
Year of death missing
British Army personnel of World War I
Scottish Football League players
Place of birth missing
Year of birth missing
Royal Engineers soldiers
Vale of Leven F.C. players
Association football fullbacks